Sergei Aleksandrovich Butyrin (born 1 April 1987) is a Russian former professional football player.

Club career
He made his Russian Football National League debut for FC Salyut-Energiya Belgorod on 8 April 2006 in a game against FC SKA-Energiya Khabarovsk.

External links
 

1987 births
People from Belgorod
Living people
Russian footballers
FC Salyut Belgorod players
FC Fakel Voronezh players
Association football defenders
FC Energomash Belgorod players
Sportspeople from Belgorod Oblast
FC Chayka Peschanokopskoye players